Sandy Mitchell (born 7 March 2000) is a British racing driver who currently competes in the British GT Championship and GT World Challenge Europe.

Career

Mitchell's racing career began at the age of four, as he took the wheel of an off-road buggy his father bought for him. His off-road interests were spurred by his racing hero at the time, Scottish rally driver Colin McRae. Mitchell began his karting career in 2009, winning the NSKC Honda Cadet Championship in his first year of competition. After claiming the Super 1 National Rotax Max Junior championship in 2014, Mitchell stepped up to single-seater competition in the new-for-2015 MSA Formula Championship. He claimed his maiden victory at Thruxton in May en route to a seventh place finish in the championship.

In 2016, Mitchell transitioned into sports car racing, joining Ecurie Ecosse in the GT4 class of the British GT Championship. Claiming two class victories at Snetterton and Donington Park, Mitchell and co-driver Ciaran Haggerty finished third in the GT4 championship. After a 2017 season which saw him compete in the British GT Championship and British LMP3 Cup, Mitchell joined Barwell Motorsport for the 2018 Blancpain GT Series Endurance Cup season. 2019 saw Mitchell reprise his role in the Barwell Motorsport entry, alongside adding a full-season drive with Prestige Performance in the Lamborghini Super Trofeo North America. It would prove to be a fruitful year for Mitchell, as he would finish third in the Super Trofeo championship, second at the Super Trofeo World Final, and win the Silver Class at the 24 Hours of Spa.

In early 2020, Mitchell was inducted into the BRDC superstars program. That year, Mitchell and co-driver Rob Collard claimed overall honors in the British GT Championship; the first championship victory of Mitchell's professional career. In October, Mitchell defended his Silver Class crown at the 24 Hours of Spa, taking victory for Barwell Motorsport for the second consecutive year.

Prior to the 2021 season, Mitchell was signed as a Lamborghini factory driver, joining Giacomo Altoè as one of the youngest drivers in the Italian marque's factory stable. Mitchell also returned to defend his British GT Championship class title in 2021. After finishing third in the championship that season, Mitchell returned to Barwell for 2022 alongside co-driver Adam Balon. The duo claimed their sole victory of the season at Silverstone, finishing second in the championship to Ram Racing's Ian Loggie. For 2023, Mitchell would team up with a new co-driver, driving alongside Shaun Balfe. Mitchell would supplement his British GT program with a full-time drive in the GT World Challenge Europe Endurance Cup, competing in the Pro class for K-Pax Racing alongside Marco Mapelli and Franck Perera.

Racing record

Career summary

* Season still in progress.

Complete GT World Challenge Europe Endurance Cup results

* Season still in progress.

Complete WeatherTech SportsCar Championship results
(key) (Races in bold indicate pole position; results in italics indicate fastest lap)

References

External links
Sandy Mitchell at the British Racing Drivers' Club
Sandy Mitchell at the British GT Championship Official Website

2000 births
Living people
British racing drivers
British F4 Championship drivers
British GT Championship drivers
Blancpain Endurance Series drivers
GT World Challenge America drivers
24H Series drivers
WeatherTech SportsCar Championship drivers
Arden International drivers
United Autosports drivers
Wayne Taylor Racing drivers
Lamborghini Squadra Corse drivers